François Lucas  is the name of:

François Lucas de Bruges (1548/9–1619), Roman Catholic biblical exegete and textual critic from the Habsburg Netherlands.
 François Édouard Anatole Lucas (4 April 1842 – 3 October 1891), a French mathematician.